Sea Isle City is a city in Cape May County, in the U.S. state of New Jersey. It is part of the Ocean City metropolitan statistical area and is more generally part of the Delaware Valley or Philadelphia metropolitan area. As of the 2020 United States census, the city's year-round population was 2,104, a decrease of 10 (−0.5%) from the 2010 census count of 2,114, which in turn reflected a decline of 721 (−25.4%) from the 2,835 counted in the 2000 census. Visitors raise the population to as much as 40,000 during the peak summer season from Memorial Day to Labor Day. Sea Isle City is located on Ludlam Island, which also contains the Strathmere section of Upper Township.

Sea Isle City was originally incorporated as a borough on May 22, 1882, from portions of Dennis Township, based on the results of a referendum held six days earlier. The borough was reincorporated on March 31, 1890. In March 1907, portions of Dennis Township and Upper Township were annexed to Sea Isle City. In April 1905, portions of Sea Isle City were annexed to Upper Township. On April 30, 1907, the area was reincorporated as the City of Sea Isle City, based on the results of a referendum held on April 20, 1907. The name derives from its location on the Atlantic Ocean.

History

Sea Isle City was founded in 1882 by Charles K. Landis, who was also the founder of Vineland, New Jersey. The main street in town, Landis Avenue, is named for its founder. The oldest building in Sea Isle City is The Colonnade Inn, a Victorian building dating back to the 1800s. From 1885 until 1924, Sea Isle City was the location of Ludlam's Beach Lighthouse.  The structure was moved to the corner of Landis Avenue and 35th Street (3414 Landis Avenue), and was a private residence (offered for rental) for many years.  A non-profit group, The Friends of the Ludlam Beach Lighthouse, was unsuccessful in its efforts to raise enough money to save the building from demolition by moving it to a new location and restoring it. It was demolished on September 21, 2010, to make way for new town homes.

The oil tanker MV Sea Isle City was renamed for this city when it was reflagged and registered in the United States in 1987 during Operation Earnest Will. It was struck by a Silkworm missile off Kuwait on October 16, 1987, wounding 18 crew members and seriously damaging the ship.

Coastal storms
There have been many hurricanes and huge storms that have hit the small island of Sea Isle City, New Jersey.  The storms of the 1890s, 1920s, and the 1944 Great Atlantic Hurricane have been some of the worst natural disasters to hit the coast of New Jersey.  The Ash Wednesday Storm of 1962, a major Nor'easter that hit on March 6, 1962, tops all other storms that have hit the area in the recent past, with three days of continuous rain. Many people evacuated in time to save their lives, but came back to find their homes and assets destroyed.  Eventually, the only way out of town was the causeway, and when that flooded, rescuers had to use helicopters to evacuate the rest of the town. It was categorized as a "100-year storm," in which almost every beachfront home or property was destroyed or damaged.

About a week later when the storm had subsided, Sea Isle City citizens moved back into their homes and began the needed revisions.  As a result of the storm, a "dune line" was formed, and this caused beachfront businesses and homes to move back from the shoreline an average of one block.

Tourism
Sea Isle City has long been popular with summer visitors. In 2002, the printed message on its signature water tower was changed from "Welcome to Sea Isle City" to "Smile! You're in Sea Isle City". The word "City" was later removed from the message in 2018.

The "Sara the Turtle Festival" is one of the city's annual festivals, celebrating a fictional turtle named Sara. Aimed towards families with young children, the festival features live animal exhibits and face painting meant to educate children about the local environment. The city hosts a Polar bear plunge every February, holding the 25th annual event in 2019, featuring many participants dressed in costume.

In 1999, the city's only amusement park, Fun City, was closed and the land was sold for development of beach homes. In 2009, a new amusement park called Gillian's Funland was opened on JFK Boulevard by the bay as a public-private venture between Sea Isle City and neighboring Ocean City mayor Jay Gillian. Funland was permanently removed, however, following the 2013 summer season for financial reasons in part due to losses from Hurricane Sandy.

In 2011, Sea Isle City began a $14 million makeover to create a public corridor from the bay to the ocean. Plans included a new boathouse on the marina, installing a new playground and basketball courts on JFK Boulevard and erecting a pavilion and band shell at Excursion Park on the city's Promenade overlooking the Atlantic Ocean. Sea Isle City became one of the first municipalities in New Jersey, along with Salem and Egg Harbor City, to implement LED streetlights powered solely by wind and solar energy. The lights were installed at the Promenade at JFK Boulevard by the South Jersey Economic Development District and the New Jersey Institute of Technology.

Geography

According to the United States Census Bureau, the city had a total area of 2.75 square miles (7.13 km2), including 2.20 square miles (5.71 km2) of land and 0.55 square miles (1.42 km2) of water (19.93%).

Sea Isle City is a beach town with most of its housing used for vacation rentals and second homes. It has a  beachfront promenade starting at 29th Street and ending on 57th street and several arcades, shops, restaurants and bars in the center of town. The epicenter of the town is John F. Kennedy Blvd. (41st Street).

Sea Isle is not an "island city" as it shares its land on Ludlam Island with Strathmere, which is part of Upper Township. Neighboring Ocean City, however, is an island city as it includes the entire island.

Unincorporated communities, localities and place names located partially or completely within the city include Ludlam Beach and Townsends Inlet (located at the south end of Ludlam Island).

Sea Isle City borders Avalon Borough, Dennis Township, Middle Township and Upper Township, along with the Atlantic Ocean.

Demographics

2010 census

The Census Bureau's 2006–2010 American Community Survey showed that (in 2010 inflation-adjusted dollars) median household income was $54,715 (with a margin of error of +/– $9,859) and the median family income was $80,219 (+/– $21,265). Males had a median income of $66,771 (+/– $34,710) versus $44,087 (+/– $6,534) for females. The per capita income for the borough was $47,174 (+/– $10,684). About 3.1% of families and 7.4% of the population were below the poverty line, including none of those under age 18 and 3.9% of those age 65 or over.

2000 census
As of the 2000 United States census there were 2,835 people, 1,370 households, and 794 families residing in the city. There were 6,622 housing units at an average density of 1, 162.2/km2 (3,006.9/sq mi). The racial makeup of the city was 97.88% White, 0.28% African American, 0.39% Native American, 0.35% Asian, 0.04% Pacific Islander, 0.07% from other races, and 0.99% from two or more races. Hispanic or Latino of any race were 1.06% of the population.

As of the 2000 Census, 30.5% of Sea Isle City residents were of Irish ancestry, the 34th-highest percentage of any municipality in the United States, and sixth-highest in New Jersey, among all places with more than 1,000 residents identifying their ancestry.

There were 1,370 households, out of which 15.5% had children under the age of 18 living with them, 48.2% were married couples living together, 6.9% had a female householder with no husband present, and 42.0% were non-families. 37.4% of all households were made up of individuals, and 18.5% had someone living alone who was 65 years of age or older. The average household size was 2.07 and the average family size was 2.71.

In the city, the population was spread out, with 15.7% under the age of 18, 5.1% from 18 to 24, 20.8% from 25 to 44, 31.4% from 45 to 64, and 27.1% who were 65 years of age or older. The median age was 51 years. For every 100 females, there were 91.4 males. For every 100 females age 18 and over, there were 89.6 males.

The median income for a household in the city was $45,708, and the median income for a family was $62,847. Males had a median income of $42,713 versus $31,375 for females. The per capita income for the city was $28,754. About 6.4% of families and 7.6% of the population were below the poverty line, including 13.7% of those under age 18 and 10.2% of those age 65 or over.

Government

Local government
Since July 1, 2007, Sea Isle City has been governed within the Faulkner Act, formally known as the Optional Municipal Charter Law, under the Mayor-Council form of government. The city is one of 71 municipalities (of the 564) statewide that use this form of government. The governing body is comprised of the Mayor and the five-member City Council. The mayor and council members serve four-year terms of office and are chosen at-large on a non-partisan basis as part of the May municipal elections. Either three council seats or two council seats and the mayoral seat are up for election in odd-numbered years. Prior to 2007, Sea Isle City had been governed under the Walsh Act form of New Jersey municipal government, by a three-member commission, starting in 1913.

, the Mayor of Sea Isle City is Leonard C. Desiderio, whose term of office ends on June 30, 2023. Members of the City Council are Council President J.B. Feeley (2025), Frank P. Edwardi Jr. (2023), Jack C. Gibson (2025), William J. Kehner Sr. (2023) and Mary L. Tighe (2025).

Federal, state and county representation
Sea Isle City is located in the 2nd Congressional District and is part of New Jersey's 1st state legislative district.

Politics
As of March 2011, there were a total of 2,060 registered voters in Sea Isle City, of which 340 (16.5%) were registered as Democrats, 1,090 (52.9%) were registered as Republicans and 629 (30.5%) were registered as Unaffiliated. There was one voter registered to another party.

In the 2012 presidential election, Republican Mitt Romney received 60.4% of the vote (916 cast), ahead of Democrat Barack Obama with 38.7% (587 votes), and other candidates with 0.9% (13 votes), among the 1,532 ballots cast by the city's 2,082 registered voters (16 ballots were spoiled), for a turnout of 73.6%. In the 2008 presidential election, Republican John McCain received 58.6% of the vote (977 cast), ahead of Democrat Barack Obama, who received 40.1% (669 votes), with 1,668 ballots cast among the city's 2,041 registered voters, for a turnout of 81.7%. In the 2004 presidential election, Republican George W. Bush received 61.7% of the vote (1,041 ballots cast), outpolling Democrat John Kerry, who received 37.0% (625 votes), with 1,687 ballots cast among the city's 2,177 registered voters, for a turnout percentage of 77.5.

In the 2013 gubernatorial election, Republican Chris Christie received 81.2% of the vote (936 cast), ahead of Democrat Barbara Buono with 17.9% (206 votes), and other candidates with 1.0% (11 votes), among the 1,172 ballots cast by the city's 2,033 registered voters (19 ballots were spoiled), for a turnout of 57.6%. In the 2009 gubernatorial election, Republican Chris Christie received 59.6% of the vote (753 ballots cast), ahead of both Democrat Jon Corzine with 32.4% (409 votes) and Independent Chris Daggett with 4.6% (58 votes), with 1,264 ballots cast among the city's 2,094 registered voters, yielding a 60.4% turnout.

Education

Resident public school students had been served by a school operated by the Sea Isle City School District until the end of the 2012 school year. Merger discussions with the Ocean City School District in 2008 ended after the Ocean City district indicated that it did not want to accept Sea Isle City's tenured teachers, which it would be required to do under state law. Sea Isle City had been spending as much as $35,000 per student and hoped to see savings through the merger, even after adding in transportation costs. The Sea Isle City district graduated its last eighth-grade class in June 2009 and with the 2010–2011 school year, students from Sea Isle City started attending the Ocean City schools starting in fifth grade. As of June 30, 2012, Sea Isle City School District no longer operates any schools, in the face of an order by the commissioner of the New Jersey Department of Education that was based on declining enrollment and budgetary issues.

All Sea Isle City students in public school for pre-kindergarten through twelfth grade are served by the Ocean City School District. As of the 2020–21 school year, the district, comprised of three schools, had an enrollment of 2,056 students and 220.4 classroom teachers (on an FTE basis), for a student–teacher ratio of 9.3:1. Schools in the district (with 2020–21 enrollment data from the National Center for Education Statistics) are 
Ocean City Primary School with 299 students in grades PreK-3, 
Ocean City Intermediate School with 468 students in grades 4-8 and 
Ocean City High School with 1,274 students in grades 9-12. Students from Corbin City, Longport and Upper Township attend Ocean City High School for ninth through twelfth grades as part of sending/receiving relationships with their respective school districts.

Students are also eligible to attend Cape May County Technical High School in the Cape May Court House area, which serves students from the entire county in its comprehensive and vocational programs, which are offered without charge to students who are county residents. Special needs students may be referred to Cape May County Special Services School District in the Cape May Court House area.

The Roman Catholic Diocese of Camden operates Bishop McHugh Regional School, a Catholic K–8 school, in the Ocean View area, Dennis Township, which has a Cape May Courthouse postal address. It is the parish school of Sea Isle City Catholic Church and three other churches.

Cape May County Library operates Sea Isle City Branch Library.

Transportation

Roads and highways

Exit 17 on the southbound Garden State Parkway in Dennis Township provides access to Sea Isle City via Sea Isle Boulevard (County Route 625), which becomes JFK Boulevard.

Turtle awareness is an important aspect in Sea Isle City. There are numerous signs in the city to watch for turtle crossings in order to prevent further endangerment of the species. One of the more common species of turtles located on the island is the diamondback terrapin. Due to coastal development, natural turtle nesting areas have deteriorated, leading the turtles to create their nesting areas on highway embankments and increased risk of being struck by a motor vehicle. From 1989 to 1995, a total of 4,020 turtles were killed in Cape May Peninsula.

Public transportation
NJ Transit offers the 315 inter-city bus route that runs through the town three times a day and shuttles people to and from Philadelphia, and the 319 route to the Port Authority Bus Terminal in Midtown Manhattan. However, due to weight restrictions on the Townsend Inlet Bridge, New Jersey Transit 315/319 bus service only stops on Central Avenue and JFK Boulevard.  Service was previously suspended due to summer traffic until a deal has been reached.

Sea Isle City used to have a trackless trolley service that operated along Landis Avenue. Since 2013, Atlantic City Jitney has served Sea Isle City with a route running along Landis Avenue from June through September.

Rail service was provided to the island by both the Atlantic City Railroad, a subsidiary of the Philadelphia and Reading Railway, and the West Jersey and Seashore Railroad, owned by the rival Pennsylvania Railroad.  The Atlantic City Railroad's line was a continuation of its line to Ocean City, running across Corson's Inlet and through Strathmere. The West Jersey and Seashore Railroad tracks branched from the Cape May Line at Sea Isle Junction, and entered the city at 41st Street, from where it continued south to Stone Harbor. The train was in use from the early 1900s until the mid-1930s after the merger of the two railroads when the tracks were removed and the streets were paved due to increased use of cars.

Climate
According to the Köppen climate classification system, Sea Isle City has a humid subtropical climate (Cfa) with hot, moderately humid summers, cool winters and year-around precipitation. Cfa climates are characterized by all months having an average mean temperature > , at least four months with an average mean temperature ≥ , at least one month with an average mean temperature ≥  and no significant precipitation difference between seasons. During the summer months in Sea Isle City, a cooling afternoon sea breeze is present on most days, but episodes of extreme heat and humidity can occur with heat index values ≥ . During the winter months, episodes of extreme cold and wind can occur with wind chill values < .

Ecology
According to the A. W. Kuchler U.S. potential natural vegetation types, Sea Isle City, New Jersey would have a dominant vegetation type of Northern Cordgrass (73) with a dominant vegetation form of Coastal Prairie (20).

Notable people

People who were born in, residents of, or otherwise closely associated with Sea Isle City include:
 Richard M. Atwater (1844–1922), chemist and glassmaker, who served as mayor of Sea Isle City from 1913–1917
 Angelo Cataldi (born 1951) is a sports radio personality for 94.1 WIP in Philadelphia
 Jeff Carter (born 1985), professional hockey player for the Pittsburgh Penguins
 Steve Corino (born 1973), professional wrestler who works for Ring of Honor
 Alexis Dziena (born 1984), actress
 Joe Flacco (born 1985), quarterback for the Denver Broncos
 Charles Lewis Fussell (1840–1909), landscape artist
 Chris Gheysens (born ), president and chief executive officer of Wawa Inc.
 John C. Gibson (born 1934), former member of the New Jersey General Assembly
 Ann J. Land (–2010), member of the Philadelphia City Council from 1980 to 1992
 Charles K. Landis (1833–1900), property developer in South Jersey, who was the founder and developer of Vineland and Sea Isle City
 Josh Mathews (born 1980), play-by-play commentator with WWE and later, Impact Wrestling
 John Stevens (born 1966), former defenseman who has coached in the NHL at various levels

References

External links

 Sea Isle City web site
 Sea Isle City Beach Patrol
 Sea Isle City Tourism Commission
 Sea Isle City Chamber of Commerce
 The Upper Township Gazette serving Sea Isle Local community newspaper

 
1882 establishments in New Jersey
Cities in Cape May County, New Jersey
Faulkner Act (mayor–council)
Jersey Shore communities in Cape May County
Populated places established in 1882